Masjed As-Saber is the largest mosque in Portland, Oregon, United States. Worship leader is Mohamed Sheikh Abdirahman Kariye who is mentioned frequently in the local news.

References

External links

Mosques in Oregon
Religious buildings and structures in Portland, Oregon